A cloudbook is a small-storage laptop which depends on networked storage services (the cloud), which come packaged with the device. Examples include Google ChromeOS cloudbooks ("Chromebooks") installed with Google Drive and Windows OS cloudbooks bundled with Microsoft's OneDrive.

References

Classes of computers
Laptops
Personal computers